The Wills Classic was a series of golf tournaments held in Australia and New Zealand from 1960 to 1964. The first event in 1960 was contested by four players over nine different courses between 17 September and 2 October; the winner determined by the aggregate score. Total prize money was A£5,100. The players were Stan Leonard, Gary Player, Mike Souchak and Peter Thomson. In 1961 the event became a 72-hole tournament with prize money of A£3,000. From 1963 the Australian tournament was replaced by the Wills Masters and the Classic event was moved to New Zealand. The New Zealand tournaments had prize money of NZ£2,000. The sponsor was W.D. & H.O. Wills, a cigarette manufacturer.

Winners

References

Golf tournaments in Australia
Golf tournaments in New Zealand
Recurring sporting events established in 1960
Recurring events disestablished in 1964